Belarus selected their Junior Eurovision Song Contest 2012 act through a national selection on 28 September 2012. Egor Zheshko represented Belarus with the song "A more-more". He placed 9th out of 12 countries in the contest with 56 points.

Before Junior Eurovision

Song For Eurovision 
The national final "Song For Eurovision" was held on 28 September 2012. Ten acts competed for the winning title. Egor Zheshko won with "A more-more", winning 1st place from both the jury and the televiewers.

At Junior Eurovision 
During the contest, Belarus opened the show, preceding Sweden. Belarus came 9th with 56 points.

Voting

Notes

References

Junior Eurovision Song Contest
Belarus
2012